Lai Chack Middle School is a secondary school in Tsim Sha Tsui, Kowloon, Hong Kong. Founded in 1929, it started as a girls' school in Wan Chai and a branch in Jordan Road. With various relocation in its history, its secondary school section finally settled in the current premises at No. 180 Canton Road in 1955.

External links

Official Website

Girls' schools in Hong Kong
Tsim Sha Tsui
Secondary schools in Hong Kong